Pound Puppies (known as All New Pound Puppies in its second season) is an American animated series made by Hanna-Barbera Productions and based on the toy line by Tonka as the sequel to the 1985 television special. Broadcast on ABC from September 13, 1986 until December 19, 1987, it is the first cartoon adaptation based on the franchise, the second being the 2010 series. 26 episodes (36 segments in total) are produced.

Plot

Cast
Main cast voices:

 Adrienne Alexander - Bright Eyes (TV special only), Brattina
 Ruth Buzzi - Nose Marie
 Pat Carroll - Katrina Stoneheart
 Nancy Cartwright - Bright Eyes
 Peter Cullen - Captain Slaughter
 Ami Foster - Holly
 Dan Gilvezan - Cooler, Bruno (in "The Bright Eyes Mob")
 Robert Morse - Howler, Barkerville (Wagga Wagga)
 B. J. Ward - Whopper
 Frank Welker - Catgut, Scrounger (season one)

Additional voices

 Chad Allen (Season 1) -
 René Auberjonois (Season 2) -
 Bever-Leigh Banfield (Season 2) -
 Allyce Beasley (Season 2) - Beezer
 Brice Beckham (Season 2) -
 Greg Berg - Beamer (uncredited)
 Gregg Berger (Season 2) - Scrounger
 Denoca Brown (Season 2) -
 Steve Bulen (Season 1) -
 Arthur Burghardt (Season 1) -
 Kristina Chan (Season 2) -
 Danny Cooksey -
 Brian Cummings (Season 1) -
 Jim Cummings (Season 2) -
 Gabriel Damon (Season 2) -
 Barry Dennen -
 Bob DoQui (Season 1) -
 Casey Ellison (Season 1) -
 Dick Erdman (Season 1) -
 Pat Fraley (Season 1) -
 Lauri Fraser (Season 2) -
 Joan Gardner (Season 1) - Zazu the Fairy Dogmother (in "The Fairy Dogmother" and "Happy Howlidays")
 Linda Gary (Season 1) -
 Phillip Glasser (Season 2) -
 Justin Gocke (Season 2) -
 Benji Gregory (Season 2) -
 Edan Gross (Season 2) -
 Kathleen Helppie (Season 2) -
 Lise Hilboldt (Season 2) -
 Dana Hill (Season 2) - Toots (in "The Bright Eyes Mob")
 Josh Horowitz (Season 2) -
 Ernie Hudson (Season 2) -
 Erv Immerman (Season 2) -
 Vaughn Jelks (Season 2) -
 Thy Lee (Season 2) -
 Katie Leigh (Season 2) -
 Michael Lembeck (Season 2) -
 Marilyn Lightstone (Season 1) -
 Nancy Linari (Season 2) -
 June Lockhart (Season 1) - Millicent Trueblood
 Chuck McCann (Season 1) -
 David Mendenhall (Season 2) -
 Don Messick - Louie, Scooby-Doo (in "Secret Agent Pup", uncredited)
 Haunani Minn (Season 1) -
 Brian Stokes Mitchell (Season 2) -
 Lorenzo Music (Season 2) - Teensy (in "Little Big Dog")
 Patty Parris (Season 2) -
 Philip Proctor (Season 2) -
 Clive Revill (Season 1) -
 Susan Rhee (Season 2) -
 Roger Rose (Season 1) -
 Ann Ryerson (Season 2) -
 Ronnie Schell (Season 1) -
 Kath Soucie (Season 2) - Arf (in "The Rescue Pups")
 Leslie Speights (Season 2) -
 John Stephenson (Season 1) - Uncle J.R. (in "Whopper Cries Uncle")
 Lauren Taylor (Season 2) -
 Russi Taylor (Season 2) - Melissa (in "Garbage Night: The Musical")
 Janice Tori (Season 2) -
 Marcelo Tubert (Season 2) -
 R. J. Williams (Season 2) -
 Mitsuru Yamahata (Season 2) -
 Dion Zamora (Season 2) -
 Patric Zimmerman (Season 1) - Shaky (in "How to Found a Pound")

Episodes

Season 1 (1986)

Season 2 (1987) 
In this season, with the exception of the final 3 episodes, episodes are now split into 2 11-minute segments.

Home media
Various episodes of the show had been released on VHS between 1988 and 1990 by Family Home Entertainment.

See also 
 List of Pound Puppies characters

References

External links 

 

1986 American television series debuts
1987 American television series endings
1980s American animated television series
ABC Family original programming
American Broadcasting Company original programming
American children's animated adventure television series
American children's animated comedy television series
American children's animated fantasy television series
American sequel television series
Animated television series about dogs
English-language television shows
Pound Puppies
Television series by Hanna-Barbera
Television shows based on Hasbro toys
Television shows based on toys
Television series by Tonka